"Five to One" is a song by American rock band the Doors, from their 1968 album Waiting for the Sun. The song's lyrics were written by lead singer Jim Morrison, though the songwriting credit identified each member of the Doors as songwriters.

Composition

Unlike some of the Doors tracks, "Five to One" was created in the studio. According to music journalist Gillian G. Gaar, the song originated during a session when Morrison asked drummer John Densmore to lay down a 4/4 beat to which he inserted the lyrics. The song is consistently applied at 4/4 time signature, accompanied by a distorted sound of drums and bass.

The tune features a rhythm and blues rhyme, and has been considered as an origin of the heavy metal genre. Critic Matthew Greenwald of AllMusic described Robby Krieger's guitar playing as "a menacing, proto-heavy metal", and on "top of that, John Densmore's relentless, almost march-rhythm drums take the song through various sections with a convincing power."

Lyrics 
Jim Morrison asserted that the song's lyrics are not political. Part of the song ("Your ballroom days are over, baby/ Night is drawing near/ Shadows of the evening/ crawl across the years"), was seemingly lifted from the 19th-century hymnal and bedtime rhyme "Now the Day Is Over" ("Now the day is over/ Night is drawing nigh/ Shadows of the evening/ Steal across the sky") by Morrison. Similarly, Morrison quoted the "Christian child's prayer" in a live version of "Soul Kitchen" sung in 1969, and also altered the children's rhyme "Jack be nimble, Jack be quick, Jack jump over the candlestick" to suit part of his poem "Curses, Invocations" in An American Prayer ("Words dissemble/ Words be quick/ Words resemble walking sticks").

Public performances
The song's most famous performance was at the 1969 Miami concert at the Dinner Key Auditorium.  Towards the end of the performance, a drunken Morrison declared the audience "idiots" and "slaves".  The concert would end with Morrison being accused of "attempting to incite a riot" among the concert goers, resulting in his arrest, and later conviction, for indecent exposure.

During the reunion of the original lineup of the Doors sans Jim Morrison on VH1 Storytellers, Scott Weiland of Stone Temple Pilots took up vocals. Before the performance John Densmore said Weiland was one of the few frontmen who could "fill Jim's leather pants". Scott said that "Five to One" was what inspired him to begin a career in rock music. In 2012, Ray Manzarek and Krieger recorded a live version of "Five to One" in the Sunset Strip Music Festival with Marilyn Manson on vocals.

Legacy
The guitar solo on Pearl Jam's "Alive" was based on Ace Frehley's guitar solo on the Kiss song "She", which was in turn based on Robby Krieger's solo in "Five to One". In 2001, producer Kanye West sampled the song to form the beat of Jay-Z's diss song of Nas and Mobb Deep called "Takeover".  The lyric featured in the track, "No one here gets out alive", was used as the title for the eponymous biography of Morrison. Stereogum declared "Five to One" the "best song the band ever recorded", while the British daily newspaper, The Guardian, ranked it fifth on their 2015 respective list.

References

External links
 Snopes webpage discussing the meaning of the song's title

The Doors songs
1968 songs
Songs written by John Densmore
Songs written by Robby Krieger
Songs written by Ray Manzarek
Songs written by Jim Morrison
Song recordings produced by Paul A. Rothchild